Setia Indah is a township in Johor Bahru, Johor, Malaysia.

History
The 888 acre freehold development was launched in January 2001. It is SP Setia's second project in Johor and has a GDV of RM1.8 billion. The township features a town park near its commercial area and has won numerous awards for its unique design and landscaping in the country. In 2007, a police station is established within the township and this has greatly reduced the crime rate in the area. A market was later built, as well as a supermarket (Maslee). The commercial area consist mainly of hawker centres and service outlets. Setia Indah is now a mature, self contained township with a population of approximately 35,000 people and has only less than 5% of land left to develop, which has been allocated for schools and commercial developments.

Development
The township contains mostly terraced house, cluster house, semi-detached house, bungalows, serviced apartments, as well as commercial units. The landed homes are spread over various precincts, which are gated and guarded with security personnel round-the-clock doing rounds in the township. Each precincts includes open area and playground for kids to play in, making this township a great place to live, play and raise kids in.

Amenities

Amenities surrounding Setia Indah are:
 Setia Indah Park
 Maslee Supermarket
 AEON MALL Bandar Dato' Onn
 Toppen Shopping Centre
 Fairview International School
 Austin Heights International School
 KPJ Bandar Dato' Onn
 Wat Traimitr Withayaram Johor

Transportation
The township is accessible by many highways, including the North-South Expressway, Pasir Gudang Highway, Eastern Dispersal Link, and the Tebrau Highway. Other modern townships surrounding Setia Indah include Seri Austin, Bandar Dato' Onn, Taman Daya, and Taman Jaya Putra Perdana.

References

Johor Bahru housing estates
Townships in Johor